Cryptogyps is an extinct genus of Old World vulture from the Pleistocene of Australia. It was relatively small for a vulture but still larger than the extant wedge-tailed eagle. Originally described as an eagle in 1905 (under the binomial name Taphaetus lacertosus), in 2022 it was reidentified as a vulture, the first known example from the continent. Phylogenetic analysis supports it being a sister species to the extant, widespread Eurasian vulture genus Gyps or as a more basal member of the subfamily. The identification of Cryptogyps as a vulture solves a longstanding mystery about the lack of specialized lineages of large scavenging birds in Australia despite being present on every other continent aside from Antarctica. It is likely that Cryptogyps went extinct towards the end of the Pleistocene due to the disappearance of the megafauna it depended on for carrion. The genus contains a single species, C. lacertosus.

History and naming
Cryptogyps has a long and complicated taxonomic history. It was initially described as “Taphaetus” lacertosus by Charles Walter De Vis in 1905 based on the lower part of a humerus and a quadrate bone of Middle-Late Pleistocene age, found around Kalamurina in South Australia. The assignment of the fossil material to "Taphaetus" by De Vis was problematic, as the genus had been declared a junior synonym of Uroaetus by De Vis himself earlier that same year. Later still Uroaetus was deemed synonymous with Aquila, as the type specimen was found to be identical to the modern wedge-tailed eagle. Subsequently, the genus "Taphaetus" was unavailable in accordance with the rules of the International Code of Zoological Nomenclature (ICZN). In 1974 Gerard Frederick van Tets suggested that "T." lacertosus was a member of the genus Icthyophaga (now synonymous with Haliaeetus) and designated the humerus as the lectotype before later placing the species in the subfamily Gypaetinae, which at the time contained all old-world vultures. A thorough examination of the lectotype humerus was published by Mather, Lee and Worthy in 2022 in order to determine if the material represented a distinct taxon. Their research concluded that the fossil not only belonged to a distinct genus and species of bird of prey, but also that it was a type of aegypiine vulture rather than a type of eagle. To reflect all this, the genus Cryptogyps was coined. Aside from the type material, fossils of indeterminate Pleistocene age were discovered in the Wellington Caves (New South Wales) and Nullarbor Plain (Western Australia).

The name Cryptogyps is a combination of the Ancient Greek "kryptos" and "gyps", meaning "hidden" and "vulture" respectively. This name reflects the fact that despite having been known for over a century, the animal's identity as a vulture had remained largely uknown. Additionally, the name also contains the word "crypt", which as an underground burial site matches the discovery of fossil material in caves. The species name means "powerful".

Description
Despite being close in size to the large wedge-tailed eagle (Aquila audax), Cryptogyps was still unusually small for an aegypiine vulture, with only the extant hooded vulture (Necrosyrtes monachus) being smaller.

Phylogeny
Initially three phylogenetic trees were recovered using a combination of both morphological and molecular data. These analysis provide moderate support for the fact that Cryptogyps was part of the clade containing aegypiine vultures and serpent eagles, with strong support for its placement in the former. The key traits that appear to place Cryptogyps in this subfamily appear to be two synapomorphies of the tarsometatarsus. Within vultures, it may have been closely related to the modern genus Gyps, which contains the modern griffon vultures. However this relationship is only poorly supported and later analysis conducted after the discovery of Dynatoaetus find different placements. In Mather et al. (2023), Cryptogyps was recovered in a more basal position outside the aegypiine crown but more derived than Dynatoaetus. The Bayesian analysis of the same publication recovers it in an even more basal position, as a sister taxon to the clade containing aegypiine vultures, serpent eagles, booted eagles, forest eagles, true hawks, buzzards, sea eagles and kites. However, this placement of Cryptogyps as its own separate branch was only weakly supported.

The two phylogenetic trees below show the strict concensus trees of both Mather, Lee and Worthy (2022) and Mather et al. (2023).

Paleobiology
The legs of Cryptogyps match the overall morphology of the generalized aegypiine hindlimb, with only shallow groves indicative of relatively weak musculature. Although the morphology is still somewhat better developed than in extant vultures, it is nowhere near as pronounced as in active predators such as the wedge-tailed eagle. It is thus likely that Cryptogyps were primarily scavengers, feeding upon dead or dying Australian megafauna and at times traveled great distances while searching for carrion. Assuming that the size of this vulture correlates with its general feeding preference, as observed in its modern relatives, Cryptogyps may have been a "gulper" or "ripper" type scavenger. This means that it may have either fed on the soft parts of carcasses, such as the internal organs, or that it may have ripped open flesh and skin. Regardless of the specifics, this would have provided a valuable ecological service by reducing disease transmission and facilitating energy flow. While nothing conclusive can be said about the specifics of its behavior, the hypothesis that Cryptogyps is related to extant griffon vultures could mean that they at times gathered in large numbers. Such social groups formed during scavenging could have provided multiple advantages, such being an aid during foraging while also driving off other scavengers. Another possibility is that Cryptogyps could have been a solitary animal or that it foraged in pairs. Still, Cryptogyps may not have been uncontested as a scavenger. In addition to the native marsupials, the contemporary Dynatoaetus was a notably larger bird and, assuming that it behaved in a similar fashion to the extant wedge-tailed eagle, may have not been above scavenging when the opportunity presented itself. The shere size of Dynatoaetus may have allowed it to successfully dominate over the smaller Cryptogyps should the two have fought over a single carcass. Similar interactions are known from Africa, where large raptors would occasionally follow vultures and drive them away from carcasses.

Given the discovery of remains across Australia, from Western Australia to New South Whales, it is possible that Cryptogyps may have been a widespread species across the continent, foraging in grassland and open woodland environments. Following the extinction of most Australian megafauna during the Quaternary extinction event about 50,000 years ago, Cryptogyps may have also gone extinct due to a lack of carrion to feed on. While large bodied kangaroos would later grow in numbers and spread into environments they did not previously inhabit, this shift may have come too late for Cryptogyps. The extinction of Cryptogyps is thought to have allowed the wedge-tailed eagle to more easily exploit this resource and become Australia's primary scavenging bird species given the lack of specialised competition.

References 

Quaternary birds of Australia
Pleistocene birds
Fossil taxa described in 1905
Aegypiinae
Prehistoric bird genera
Taxa named by Charles Walter De Vis